Perumal Mupnar is a former Fijian politician of Indian Tamil descent, who held the Yasawa Nawaka Open Constituency in the House of Representatives for the Fiji Labour Party in the parliamentary election of 2001.  In the parliamentary election held on 6–13 May 2006, he transferred to the Nadi Rural Indian Communal Constituency and held it for the FLP.

He was appointed a Senator following the 1999 election.

In 2003 he was one of the 14 FLP parliamentarians offered a cabinet position in the multi - party cabinet by Laisenia Qarase. He was offered the portfolio of Ministry for Transport but the FLP members did not take up the offer as they regarded the portfolios to be trivial.

After the 2006 general election, he became the Fiji Labour Party Whip in the House of Representatives.

He fell out with FLP leader, Mahendra Chaudhry, after speaking out against Chaudhry's choice of Senators following the 2006 election.

References 

Year of birth missing (living people)
Living people
Fijian Tamil politicians
Fiji Labour Party politicians
Indian members of the House of Representatives (Fiji)
Indian members of the Senate (Fiji)
Fijian Hindus
Politicians from Nadi
Fijian politicians of Indian descent